Following is a list of militant groups fighting for the independence of Ambazonia, commonly referred to locally as "Amba Boys". It should be recalled that there are other groups involved but their tactics remain nonviolent. Due to the obscure nature of many of the smaller groups, this list will remain incomplete until more information becomes available.

Many Ambazonian rebel groups and their commanders take symbolic names which reference animals or specific personal traits; these are used to evoke fear and respect.

List

Footnotes 
 The Bui Unity Warriors were organized by commanders previously associated with the Ambazonia Self-Defence Council (ASC), but they fight against other groups that were ASC members since early 2022.
 Two deceased separatist commanders have been known as "General Lion". One of them was killed in February 2021, the other in December 2022.

References

Works cited 

 

National liberation movements in Africa
Ambazonia
Ambazonia